"California" is a country music song written by John Rich, Rodney Clawson, and Vicky McGehee. It was originally recorded by Tim McGraw on his album Damn Country Music, featuring Big & Rich on backing vocals. Big & Rich released their own version in 2017 as a single, and it appears on their 2017 album Did It for the Party.

History
Tim McGraw recorded the song on his 2015 album Damn Country Music, with Big & Rich on background vocals. McGraw chose to put it on the album because his guitar player played a demo which was recorded by John Rich, one-half of the duo.

Content
The song is a country rock song about an ending relationship, focusing on a woman who is leaving her man on a journey to California.

Chart performance

Weekly charts

Year-end charts

References

2017 singles
2015 songs
Big & Rich songs
Tim McGraw songs
Songs written by John Rich
Songs written by Rodney Clawson
Songs written by Vicky McGehee
Song recordings produced by John Rich
Songs about California